Shab Tra is a Tibetan cuisine dish of stir-fried meat tossed with celery, carrots and fresh green chili.

See also
 List of Tibetan dishes

Tibetan cuisine